57th ACE Eddie Awards
February 18, 2007

Feature Film (Dramatic) (tie): 
Babel and The Departed

Feature Film(Comedy or Musical): 
Dreamgirls

The 57th ACE Eddie Awards of the American Cinema Editors were given on 18 February 2007 in the International Ballroom, Beverly Hilton Hotel, Los Angeles, California, USA.

Winners and nominees

Film
Best Edited Feature Film - Drama (tie):
Babel - Douglas Crise and Stephen Mirrione
The Departed - Thelma Schoonmaker 
Best Edited Feature Film - Musical or Comedy:
Dreamgirls - Virginia Katz
Best Edited Documentary Film:
An Inconvenient Truth - Jay Cassidy and Dan Swietlik

TV
Best Edited Miniseries or Motion Picture for Commercial Television
The Path to 9/11

Nominees

Film
Best Edited Feature Film - Drama: 
Casino Royale - Stuart Baird 
The Queen - Lucia Zucchetti 
United 93 - Clare Douglas, Christopher Rouse and Richard Pearson
Best Edited Feature Film - Musical or Comedy:
The Devil Wears Prada - Mark Livolsi 
Little Miss Sunshine - Pamela Martin
Pirates of the Caribbean: Dead Man's Chest - Craig Wood and Stephen E. Rivkin 
Thank You for Smoking - Dana E. Glauberman
Best Edited Documentary Film
When the Levees Broke: A Requiem in Four Acts (Part One) - Samuel D. Pollard 
Baghdad ER - Patrick McMahon and Carrie Goldman

References

Sources
ACE Award 2007 at the Internet Movie Database

2007 film awards
2007 guild awards
57
2007 in American cinema